Sir Arthur Rowland Knapp CBE CSI KCIE (10 December 1870 – 22 May 1954) was a British civil servant who served as the Revenue Member of the Executive Council of the Governor of Madras from 1923 to 1926.

Early life 

Arthur Knapp was born at Woolston in 1870 to Lt Col. Charles Barrett Knapp. He was educated at Westminster School and Christ Church, Oxford. He married Florence Annie Moore on 9 August 1899 at Madras, India.
His wife Florence was the daughter of Edward Moore, DD Principal of St Edmunds Hall Oxford.

His daughter Margaret Elfreda Knapp was married to the prominent Royal Navy officer and Director of Naval Intelligence Anthony Buzzard, and the theologian Anthony F. Buzzard is his grandson.

Career 

A Knapp joined the Indian civil service in 1891 and served as Assistant Collector and magistrate, Malabar district, Madras. In 1899, he was appointed Under-secretary in the Board of Revenue rising to become Secretary. His inexperience and lack of understanding about the nuances of local culture led to many of his administrative reforms being ineffective and unpopular. Long after Knapp had left Malabar, his name was assimilated into Malayalam as "knappan", translated as "an incompetent individual".

Knapp was made a Commander of the Order of the British Empire in 1919, invested as a Companion, Order of the Star of India (C.S.I.) in 1922 and Knight Commander of the Order of the Indian Empire in the 1924 New Year Honours list.

Legislative Council 

In 1923, Knapp was nominated to the Madras Legislative Council and served from 1923 to 1926.

Death 

Knapp died on 22 May 1954 at the age of 83.

References 

 

1870 births
1954 deaths
Alumni of Christ Church, Oxford
Commanders of the Order of the British Empire
Companions of the Order of the Star of India
Knights Commander of the Order of the Indian Empire
Madras Presidency
Indian Civil Service (British India) officers